Sňatky z rozumu is a 1968 Czechoslovak television miniseries directed by František Filip.

References

External links
 CSFD.cz – Sňatky z rozumu
 

Czechoslovak television series
1968 Czechoslovak television series debuts
Czech drama television series
1960s Czechoslovak television series
Czechoslovak Television original programming